Kathmandu Ring Road is an eight-lane ring road circling around the cities of Kathmandu and Lalitpur.
It has a right of way of 62m (with 31m on either side of the center line).

Route 
The road connects major places like Kalanki, Satdobato, Gwarko, Balkumari, Koteswor, Tinkune, Tribhuvan International Airport, Gaushala, Chabhil, Sukedhara, Maharajganj, Basundhara, Samakhushi, Gongabu, Balaju, and Swayambhunath.

History
To ease traffic congestion at Kalanki, Nepal's first underpass was constructed in 2018.
In 2019, Ring Road served as a sporting venue for Cycling events at the 2019 South Asian Games.

Expansion 
The government has decided to expedite construction of the proposed 71.93 km Outer Ring Road that is supposed to encircle most of the urban areas in Kathmandu Valley. The Detailed Project Report (DPR) was prepared in 2008.

See also
China-Nepal relations
New Road of Kathmandu
Mahendra Highway
Kathmandu

References

Transport in Kathmandu
Highways in Nepal
Ring roads